

Acts of Senedd Cymru

|-
| {{|Welsh Elections (Coronavirus) Act 2021|cyshort=Deddf Etholiadau Cymru (Coronafeirws) 2021|asc|2|16-03-2021|maintained=y|archived=n|An Act of Senedd Cymru to provide for measures relating to protection against coronavirus to apply to Senedd Cymru elections and local government elections.|cylong=Deddf Senedd Cymru i ddarparu i fesurau sy'n ymwneud â diogelu rhag y coronafeirws fod yn gymwys i etholiadau Senedd Cymru ac etholiadau llywodraeth leol.}}
|-
| {{|Renting Homes (Amendment) (Wales) Act 2021|cyshort=Deddf Rhentu Cartrefi (Diwygio) (Cymru) 2021|asc|3|07-04-2021|maintained=y|archived=n|An Act of Senedd Cymru to make provision about security of occupation under the Renting Homes (Wales) Act 2016; to make miscellaneous provision relating to occupation contracts; and for connected purposes.|cylong=Deddf Senedd Cymru i wneud darpariaeth ynglŷn â sicrwydd meddiannaeth o dan Ddeddf Rhentu Cartrefi (Cymru) 2016; i wneud darpariaeth amrywiol yn ymwneud â chontractau meddiannaeth; ac at ddibenion cysylltiedig.}}
|-
| {{|Curriculum and Assessment (Wales) Act 2021|cyshort=Deddf Cwricwlwm ac Asesu (Cymru) 2021|asc|4|29-04-2021|maintained=y|archived=n|An Act of Senedd Cymru to establish a new framework for a curriculum for pupils of compulsory school age at maintained schools and pupil referral units, for children of compulsory school age for whom education is otherwise arranged by local authorities, for pupils at maintained nursery schools and for certain other children for whom nursery education is provided; to make provision about progression and assessment in connection with a curriculum for those pupils and children; to make provision about a curriculum for pupils above compulsory school age at maintained schools; and for connected purposes.|cylong=Deddf gan Senedd Cymru i sefydlu fframwaith newydd ar gyfer cwricwlwm i ddisgyblion o'r oedran ysgol gorfodol mewn ysgolion a gynhelir ac unedau cyfeirio disgyblion, i blant o'r oedran ysgol gorfodol y mae addysg fel arall wedi ei threfnu ar eu cyfer gan awdurdodau lleol, i ddisgyblion mewn ysgolion meithrin a gynhelir ac i blant penodol eraill y darperir addysg feithrin ar eu cyfer; i wneud darpariaeth ynghylch cynnydd ac asesu mewn cysylltiad â chwricwlwm i'r disgyblion hynny a'r plant hynny; i wneud darpariaeth ynghylch cwricwlwm i ddisgyblion sy'n hŷn na'r oedran ysgol gorfodol mewn ysgolion a gynhelir; ac at ddibenion cysylltiedig.}}
}}

References

2021